The Family Under the Bridge is a seasonal children's novel by Natalie Savage Carlson published in 1958. It received a Newbery Honor Award.

Plot
In the early 1900s a Parisian hobo named Armand dislikes children; but after meeting three children, Suzy, Evelyn, and Paul and their mother – he reluctantly allows them to share his space under a bridge in Paris during the Christmas season. Their ingenuity and talent helps them feed themselves, and he soon becomes attached to the children and determines to provide a home for them. Eventually, he becomes a hardworking man.

Awards
Newbery Honor (1959)
A Horn Book Fanfare Best Book (1959)

References

1958 American novels
1958 children's books
Newbery Honor-winning works
American children's novels
Christmas children's books
Novels set in Paris
Novels about homelessness